The House Without Laughter (German: Das Haus ohne Lachen) is a 1923 German silent drama film directed by Gerhard Lamprecht.

The film's sets were designed by the art director Robert A. Dietrich.

Cast
In alphabetical order
Theodor Burghardt
Rudolf Del Zopp as servant  
Henrik Galeen as William Blent  
Paul Gunther 
Egon Kleyersburg
Adelheid Mannstedt
Harry Nestor as Lester
Maria Peterson as cook
Edith Posca as Enid White
Mathilde Sussin as William's wife

References

External links

Films of the Weimar Republic
Films directed by Gerhard Lamprecht
German silent feature films
UFA GmbH films
German black-and-white films
German drama films
1923 drama films
Silent drama films
1920s German films